The list of shipwrecks in 1933 includes ships sunk, foundered, grounded, or otherwise lost during 1933.

January

1 January

3 January

4 January

5 January

6 January

8 January

15 January

17 January

19 January

20 January

21 January

23 January

24 January

25 January

27 January

28 January

30 January

31 January

Unknown date

February

2 February

3 February

4 February

5 February

6 February

9 February

11 February

13 February

14 February

18 February

19 February

20 February

21 February

23 February

24 February

25 February

26 February

28 February

March

1 March

2 March

6 March

7 March

8 March

10 March

11 March

14 March

15 March

19 March

21 March

22 March

23 March

25 March

26 March

27 March

29 March

Unknown date

April

1 April

4 April

5 April

9 April

13 April

18 April

20 April

23 April

24 April

26 April

27 April

30 April

May

2 May

5 May

6 May

7 May

8 May

12 May

15 May

18 May

19 May

20 May

21 May

22 May

23 May

26 May

27 May

28 May

29 May

31 May

June

1 June

5 June

8 June

11 June

14 June

17 June

18 June

19 June

24 June

25 June

26 June

30 June

July

2 July

3 July

6 July

9 July

11 July

13 July

14 July

19 July

20 July

23 July

24 July

25 July

29 July

30 July

31 July

August

3 August

4 August

7 August

8 August

11 August

13 August

14 August

15 August

16 August

20 August

22 August

23 August

24 August

25 August

26 August

31 August

September

1 September

2 September

6 September

10 September

11 September

14 September

15 September

16 September

17 September

18 September
For the scuttling of the Reichsmarine barque Niobe on this day, see the entry for 26 July 1932

20 September

21 September

22 September

23 September

24 September

27 September

30 September

October

1 October

3 October

4 October

6 October

8 October

9 October

10 October

12 October

13 October

17 October

18 October

19 October

20 October

22 October

23 October

24 October

26 October

29 October

31 October

November

2 November

3 November

4 November

5 November

7 November

8 November

10 November

11 November

12 November

14 November

15 November

16 November

17 November

18 November

19 November

20 November

22 November

23 November

24 November

26 November

27 November

28 November

29 November

30 November

December

1 December

2 December

4 December

5 December

7 December

8 December

9 December

10 December

12 December

13 December

15 December

16 December

17 December

18 December

20 December

21 December

22 December

23 December

24 December

25 December

26 December

27 December

28 December

29 December

Unknown date

References

1933
Shipwrecks
Maritime incidents in 1933